The 12th General Assembly of Prince Edward Island represented the colony of Prince Edward Island between January 14, 1825, and 1831.

The Assembly sat at the pleasure of the Governor of Prince Edward Island, John Ready.  John Stewart was elected speaker.

Members

The members of the Prince Edward Island Legislature after the general election of 1825 were:

Notes:

External links 
 Journal of the House of Assembly of Prince Edward Island (1825)

Terms of the General Assembly of Prince Edward Island
1825 establishments in Prince Edward Island
1831 disestablishments in Prince Edward Island